The Nelson Mandela World Human Rights Moot Court Competition is a moot court competition on international human rights law. In 2009, the University of Pretoria Faculty of Law's Centre for Human Rights, with the assistance of the Office of the United Nations High Commissioner for Human Rights, organised the inaugural edition. Previously, the oral rounds of the competition were held annually in Pretoria, the administrative and de facto capital of South Africa. In more recent years, the competition has been held in Geneva, where the United Nations is headquartered.

Moot format

The moot involves a written round after which teams are selected for the oral round. Teams argue a hypothetical case on issues of international human rights law in English, Spanish, or French as if it will be adjudicated by a hypothetical International Human Rights Court, on the basis of the Universal Declaration of Human Rights and other applicable (such as regional) human rights instruments.

The regional rounds are judged by distinguished legal academics and legal professionals from around the world. In the final for the international rounds, the panel is made up of eminent jurists and judges from international tribunals and bodies such as the different regional human rights courts and UN human rights treaty bodies. The inaugural presiding judge was Navi Pillay, while Judge Mark Villiger of the European Court of Human Rights presided in the 2010 final.

Previous overall winners (English rounds)

See also
 Moot court
 Centre for Human Rights
 African Human Rights Moot Court Competition
 South African National Schools Moot Court Competition
 Mock trial

References

External links
 OHCHR Official site of the Office of the United Nations High Commissioner for Human Rights
 CHR Official site of the Centre for Human Rights

University of Pretoria
Moot court competitions
Human rights lawyers
United Nations High Commissioner for Human Rights